Susana Caldas Lamaitre (born April 5, 1964) She is a Colombian architect and beauty queen crowned Miss Colombia 1983. Caldas finished as fourth runner-up in Miss Universe 1984.

References

1964 births
Living people
Miss Colombia winners